is a railway station in Aoba-ku, Sendai in Miyagi Prefecture, Japan, operated by East Japan Railway Company (JR East).

Lines

Station layout
The station has two opposed side platforms connected to the station building by a level crossing. The station has a "Midori no Madoguchi" staffed ticket office.

Platforms

History
Kunimi Station opened on 1 February 1984.

Passenger statistics
In fiscal 2018, the station was used by an average of 3,227 passengers daily (boarding passengers only).

Surrounding area
The surrounding area is mainly residential and filled with low-cost student housing where students commute to the nearby Tohoku University Kawauchi Campus.

See also
 List of railway stations in Japan

References

External links

 

Stations of East Japan Railway Company
Railway stations in Sendai
Senzan Line
Railway stations in Japan opened in 1984